İzmir is a transportation hub for western Anatolia. İzmir has an extensive bus system, a developing metro and commuter rail system and a large urban ferry network. The city also has a highway to Çeşme and Aydın as well as a ring around the city. Mass transportation is operated by four separate public agencies all owned by the İzmir Municipality.

Road transport

İzmir is a major hub in roadways in the Aegean Region of Turkey. İzmir is the hub of motorways in the region and also is connected to the European road network.

Motorways
  İzmir Çevre Yolu - Beltway of İzmir, linking Çiğli, northern Karşıyaka, Bayraklı, Bornova, Buca and Balçova.
 İzmir-İstanbul Otoyolu - To Gebze via Manisa, Balıkesir and Bursa. Connects to the O-22 in Bursa and O-4 in Gebze
  İzmir-Aydın Otoyolu - To Aydın via Torbalı and Selçuk. Connects to the O-30 in Buca.
  İzmir-Çeşme Otoyolu - To Çeşme via Narlıdere, Güzelbahçe and Urla. Connects to the O-30 in Balçova.
 Kuzey Ege Otoyolu - To Çandarlı via Aliağa and Menemenç Connects to the O-30 in Menemen.

European Roads
- South to Antalya via Aydın and Denizli. North to Odessa via Gelibolu, Kırklareli, Burgas, Varna and Constanța.
 - Northeast to İzmit via Manisa, Balıkesir and Bursa.
- East to Sivrihisar via Uşak and Afyonkarahisar.

State Roads
 - North to Edirne via Edremit and Çanakkale. South to Muğla via Aydın. - North to Bandırma via Manisa, and Balıkhesir.
 - East to Van via Uşak, Afyonkarahisar, Konya, Aksaray, Nevşehir, Kayseri, Malatya, Elazığ, Bingöl, Muş and Bitlis. West to Çeşme.

Buses 

ESHOT, along with its subsidiary İZULAŞ are the two main bus transit service in İzmir. Buses serve all districts, however, denser network presence attained in the central area. ESHOT is owned by the İzmir Metropolitain Mucicipality (İBB). Also there is an intercity bus terminal in Bornova with many daily buses to all around Turkey.

Rail transport

İzmir was the start of the oldest railway in Anatolia; The İzmir-Aydın Railway. The city is also a rail hub and the headquarters of District 3 of the Turkish State Railways is housed in Alsancak Terminal. İzmir also has the Turkey's largest commuter railroad; İZBAN, which carries an average 100,000 passengers daily. The İzmir Metro is a developing Rapid Transit system, opened in 2000. The railroad junction in Hilal is the only crisscross junction in Turkey, between two main lines.

Intercity and Regional Rail

The Turkish State Railways operates intercity and regional rail services to and from İzmir. Like İstanbul, İzmir has two main railway stations. Alsancak Terminal and Basmane Terminal. Basmane station services frequent regional train service to the south and southeast of the İzmir Province. Alsancak station services mainline trains to Ankara, Bandırma and Afyon as well as regional service to Uşak.

Four mainline trains service İzmir. The İzmir Blue Train and Karesi Express are overnight trains running daily to Ankara, via Manisa–Balıkesir–Kütahya and Eskişehir. The 6th of September Express and the 17th of September Express are fast daily trains to Bandırma, with İDO connections to İstanbul. A daily regional train to Uşak, via Manisa operates from Alsancak. Regional train service to the Aydın Province and southern İzmir Province operate from Basmane station. Turkey's third busiest regional corridor; the İzmir-Ödemiş corridor starts at Basmane station. 7 daily trains operate to and from Ödemiş. A daily regional train to Aydın, 4 daily to Nazilli (via Aydın) and 2 daily trains to Tire operate as well as a daily train to Söke.

İZBAN Commuter Rail

İZBAN, short for İzmir Banliyö, operates commuter rail service from Alsancak station to Aliağa, via Bayraklı, Karşıyaka, Çiğli and Menemen and Cumaovası via Şirinyer and Gaziemir. İZBAN started operation on August 30, 2010 and since has carried 1.6 million people, making it one of the fastest growing commuter railroads in the world. İZBAN operates 164 daily trains between Cumaovası and Aliağa. İZBAN is also busier than the rest of Turkey's commuter railroads combined. The railroad is planned to be expanded to Bergama, Manisa, Torbalı and Selçuk by 2017.

Metro

The İzmir Metro is a developing rapid transit system with one line currently running from Fahrettin Altay, through Konak to Evka-3. One line remains under construction between Tınaztepe and Üçyol. The existing line is currently being extended to Narlıdere.

Tram 

Tram İzmir is a tram network in İzmir, Turkey. Owned by the İzmir Metropolitan Municipality and operated by İzmir Metro A.Ş., the system consists of two separate lines: one in Karşıyaka, which opened on April 11, 2017, and the other in Konak, which opened on March 24, 2018.

The total cost of these two lines is about ₺450 million (approx. US$120 million).

Aviation 
There are two major airports in İzmir, the Çiğli Air Base (IATA: IGL, ICAO: LTBL) and the Adnan Menderes International Airport . Adnan Menderes Airport is located 18 km (11 mi) southwest of the city center in the Gaziemir district . Adnan Menderes Airport replaced Çiğli Air Base in the 1980s as the city's civil airport. Çiğli Air Base is now used only as a military base.

In 2017, Adnan Menderes Airport served 12.8 million passengers, 10.5 million of which were domestic passengers. It has ranked 5th in terms of total passenger traffic (after Atatürk Airport, Antalya Airport, Sabiha Gökçen Airport and Esenboğa Airport), and 4th in terms of domestic passenger traffic (after Atatürk Airport, Sabiha Gökçen Airport and Esenboğa Airport) within the country.

See also
 ESHOT
 Trolleybuses in Izmir

References

External links